Cotyzineus bruchi is a species of beetle in the family Cerambycidae, the only species in the genus Cotyzineus.

References

Acanthoderini